Saint David of Munktorp (David av Munktorp) was an Anglo-Saxon Cluniac monk of the 11th century.

David was sent as a missionary to Sweden  by Saint Sigfrid of Växjö along with Saint Botvid and Saint Eskil. The missionaries David, Eskil, and  Botvid preached chiefly in Södermanland and Västmanland, in the area of Lake Mälaren.

David is associated with Munktorp, a village situated in Köping Municipality, in Västmanland County.  He reportedly originated Munktorp Church (Munktorps kyrka).  The original church structures are known as David's Church (Davidskyrkan). Munktorp Church is in Västerås diocese, northeast of Köping, Sweden.

David became known as the Västmanland apostle (Västmanlands apostel). David sought to become a martyr but died peacefully in 1082 of old age. After his death, his remains were buried in Munktorps kyrka.

According to the Västerås breviary, David came to evangelize in Sweden in order to become a martyr. It further says that David "wandered among villages and towns, preaching the word of God and baptizing the converted, kept nightly prayer vigils, committing to God with tears and sighs his plentiful offspring, which he had thus born in the Lord".

References

External links
Munktorps kyrka, Köping

11th-century Swedish people
Anglo-Saxon saints
Medieval Swedish saints
Viking Age clergy
11th-century Christian saints
1082 deaths